Tatlı is a village in the Yüksekova District of Hakkâri Province in Turkey. The village is populated by Kurds of the Pinyanişî tribe and had a population of 29 in 2021.

References 

Villages in Yüksekova District
Kurdish settlements in Hakkâri Province